Przewalski's gerbil or Przewalski's jird (Brachiones przewalskii) is a species of rodent in the family Muridae. It is the only species in the genus Brachiones, and is found only in China.

References

Mammals described in 1889
Gerbils
Rodents of China
Taxonomy articles created by Polbot

Taxa named by Eugen Büchner